The National Television and Radio Company of Uzbekistan (MTRK) is the national broadcaster of Uzbekistan, operating four television networks.

Two new channels were launched by the company in early 2013: 'Madaniyat va Maʼrifat' ('Culture and Enlightenment') and 'Dunyo boʻylab' ('Around the World'). By the end of the year, four new channels were launched using frequencies of private television channels which were prohibited by the Uzbek authorities.

In January 2013, the organisation's website was hacked by someone who was going with the handle @CloneSecurity. The attack was said to have been launched for political reasons.

TV channels

Nationwide 
 Oʻzbekiston (flagship national channel)
 Uzbekistan (satellite version of Oʻzbekiston)
 Yoshlar (youth channel)
 Sport
 UzHD (High Definition channel)
 Madaniyat va Maʼrifat (Culture and Enlightenment)
 Dunyo Boʻylab (Around the World)
 Bolajon (children's channel, offspring of Yoshlar)
 Navo (music channel, offspring of Yoshlar)
 Oilaviy (family channel, offspring of Oʻzbekiston)
 Diyor (country)
 Kinoteatr (movie channel, offspring of Dunyo Bo'ylab)
 Mahalla (society)
 Oʻzbekiston 24 (news channel)
 Oʻzbekiston tarixi (historical channel, formerly UZHD)
 Foreign Languages

Regional 
 Andijon (Andijan)
 Buxoro (Bukhara)
 Farg‘ona (Fergana)
 Jizzax (Jizzakh)
Namangan
Navoiy
 Qaraqalpaqstan (Karakalpakstan)
Qashqadaryo
 Samarqand (Samarkand)
Sirdaryo
 Surxondaryo
 Toshkent (available throughout Uzbekistan)
Xorazm

Radio channels
 Oʻzbekiston
 Yoshlar
 Toshkent
 Mahalla
 O‘zbekiston24

References

External links
 Official website
 Legislation of Uzbekistan

Mass media in Uzbekistan
Television stations in Uzbekistan
Television channels and stations established in 1956
State media
1956 establishments in the Soviet Union